Víctor Heredia (born 24 January 1947, in Buenos Aires) is an Argentine singer songwriter.

Biography
He was born in the neighborhood of Monserrat, in the city of Buenos Aires, though he grew up in Paso del Rey, a city in the Moreno area of Greater Buenos Aires. His paternal family is of French origin, whereas his maternal grandmother was of Capayán indigenous origin, born in the Calchaquí Valleys, in the province of Catamarca. When he was young, he won the newcomer's prize in the Cosquín Festival.
Many of his songs address what he sees as the social problems in Latin American and various human rights issues. In 1972 the singer turned into the first Argentine entrant in the first edition of the OTI Festival which was held in Madrid. His song "Sabes que estamos aquí América (You know we are here America) ended last in a tie with other four entrants, his talent didn't go unnoticed. He has recorded with various artists, such as Joan Manuel Serrat, Mercedes Sosa, León Gieco, Milton Nascimento, el Cuarteto Zupay [the Zupay Quartet], Silvio Rodríguez, and Pablo Milanés, amongst others.

He was banned during the military Argentine dictatorship, which started in 1976. This dictatorship left an estimated 30,000 (7,000 documented and identified by name <https://web.archive.org/web/20170329045510/http://www.jus.gob.ar/derechoshumanos/areas-tematicas/ruvte.aspx> ) missing persons including his sister, Maria Cristina. Heredia collaborates closely with organizations that denounce the crimes of the dictatorship, such as the Mothers of the Plaza de Mayo and the Grandmothers of the Plaza de Mayo, and also with organizations of indigenous peoples.

His works include Todavía Cantamos ("Still We Sing"), Sobreviviendo ("Surviving"), El viejo Matías ("The old man Matías"), Dulce Daniela ("Sweet Daniela"), and Razón de vivir ("Reason to live"). His albums include Taki Ongoy, a conceptual work composed in 1986 in homage to Taki Ongoy, an indigenous movement that arose in the sixteenth century (1560–1572) in opposition to the Spanish invasion.

Prizes
 Winner of the Viña del Mar International Song Festival in 1994.

Discography 

 Shouting Hopes, 1968 (Gritando Esperanzas)
 Víctor Heredia, 1969
 The Old man Matías, 1970 (El Viejo Matías)
 Where I come from, 1971 (De Donde Soy)
 Reasons, 1973 (Razones)
 Víctor Heredia Sings Works by Pablo Neruda, 1974
 Drink from my Water Jug, 1975 (Bebe En Mi Cántaro)
 Paso Del Rey, 1976 (Paso Del Rey)
 When I Say Woman, 1977 (Cuando Yo Digo Mujer)
 That Beautiful Song, 1978
 Already You Can See It, The Day is Dawning, 1981
 Opened doors, 1982
 Recital, 1982
 Víctor Heredia Canta Paul Neruda (new version), 1983
 Those Little Lead Toy Soldiers, 1983
 I Only Want to Live, 1984
 Courage!, 1985
 Taki Ongoy, 1986
 A Day of Grace, 1987
 Memory, 1988
 Letter From A Shipwrecked person, 1991
 Meanwhile, 1992
 Syndrome Of Love, 1994
 Víctor Heredia Live from The Back-room, 1995
 Of Love and Of Blood, 1996
 Footprints(or Marks), 1998
 RCA Club – Víctor Heredia, 1998
 Live Heredia 1 and 2, 2000
 Then, 2001
 Phoenix, 2003
 Tenderly Friends, 2005
 Citizen, 2008

References

1944 births
Living people
People from Buenos Aires Province
Argentine activists
20th-century Argentine male singers
Argentine people of French descent
Argentine people of Quechua descent
Argentine Romani people
Romani activists
Romani musicians
Romani singers
Latin Grammy Lifetime Achievement Award winners
21st-century Argentine male singers